Fayetteville Mutual Insurance Company Building, also known as the Point News building, is a historic commercial building located at Fayetteville, Cumberland County, North Carolina.  It was built about 1853, and is a two-story trapezoidal-shaped Greek Revival style brick building.

It was listed on the National Register of Historic Places in 1983.

References

Commercial buildings on the National Register of Historic Places in North Carolina
Greek Revival architecture in North Carolina
Commercial buildings completed in 1853
Buildings and structures in Fayetteville, North Carolina
National Register of Historic Places in Cumberland County, North Carolina
1853 establishments in North Carolina